Massachusetts House of Representatives' Barnstable, Dukes and Nantucket district in the United States is one of 160 legislative districts included in the lower house of the Massachusetts General Court. It covers Dukes County, Nantucket County, and part of Barnstable County. Since 2017, Dylan A. Fernandes of the Democratic Party has represented the district. Fernandes is running unopposed in the 2020 Massachusetts general election.

Towns represented
The district includes the following localities:
 Aquinnah
 Chilmark
 Edgartown
 part of Falmouth
 Gosnold
 Nantucket
 Oak Bluffs
 Tisbury
 West Tisbury

The current district geographic boundary overlaps with those of the Massachusetts Senate's Cape and Islands and Plymouth and Barnstable districts.

Representatives
 Eric T. Turkington
 Timothy R. Madden
 Dylan A. Fernandes, 2017-current

See also
 List of Massachusetts House of Representatives elections
 Other Barnstable County districts of the Massachusetts House of Representatives: 1st, 2nd, 3rd, 4th, 5th
 List of Massachusetts General Courts
 List of former districts of the Massachusetts House of Representatives

References

External links
 Ballotpedia
  (State House district information based on U.S. Census Bureau's American Community Survey).

House
Government of Barnstable County, Massachusetts
Dukes County, Massachusetts
Nantucket, Massachusetts